Guy Spier (born February 4, 1966) is a Zurich-based investor. He is the author of The Education of a Value Investor. Spier is the manager of the Aquamarine Fund with $350 million in assets. He is well known for bidding US$650,100 with Mohnish Pabrai for a charity lunch with Warren Buffett in 2008. In 2009, he was featured in The Checklist Manifesto, by Atul Gawande regarding his use of checklists as part of his investment process. His the brother of Tanya de Jager.

Education and early life
Spier was born in 1966 in Pietermaritzburg, South Africa. When he was three months old, his family moved to Tel Aviv, Israel, where he attended kindergarten. In 1970, his family moved to Iran, where he attended the British Embassy School in Tehran. In 1977, his family moved again to Richmond in the UK, and he attended the City of London Freemen's School, in Ashtead, Surrey, as a weekly boarder. In 1984, he matriculated to study Law at Brasenose College, Oxford, where he was tutored by Hugh Collins, Peter Birks and Mary Stokes, among others. Two years later, in 1986, he switched to study PPE (Politics, Philosophy and Economics). Among his tutors was Peter Sinclair for Economics – where he occasionally shared tutorials with David Cameron, who would go on to become Prime Minister. He also studied politics with Vernon Bogdanor. Although he was thoroughly mediocre at Politics, he proved to be a capable economist and graduated with a First-class degree, having also been awarded the Georg Webb Medley Prize for his performance in Economics.

During his university summers, Spier also completed courses of study at Ruprecht Karl University of Heidelberg and at Harvard Summer School. He also interned with Creditanstalt in London.

In 1990, Spier was offered places both in the Joint Business and Economics PhD program and at the MBA Program at Harvard. He opted to do the MBA and, in 1993, he completed his MBA. Contemporaries at HBS include Mark Pincus, Chris Hohn and Sherry Coutu.

Career
From 1988 to 1990, Spier was an associate at Braxton Associates, the strategy consulting firm which was later sold to Deloitte Consulting. Based out of the London and Paris offices, Spier worked with colleagues David Pitt-Watson, Michael Liebreich, and others in advising British and European companies on their strategy vis-a-vis the European Common market. He subsequently took up an internship at the Forward Studies Unit (Cellule de Prospective) at the European Commission in Brussels.

In his book, Spier writes that although he interviewed with white-shoe firms like Goldman Sachs and J. P. Morgan during his last year at Harvard Business School, he turned down these firms to work for the lesser-known D.H. Blair. There, as a Vice President, he sought funding for new technology startups. Spier subsequently described this experience as "not dissimilar" to the movie Wolf of Wall Street. It was a career decision that he quickly came to regret.

Upon leaving investment banking, Spier founded the Aquamarine Fund, an investment partnership inspired by, and styled after, Warren Buffett's 1950s investment partnerships. Spier continues to manage the fund today, and it had $300 million in AUM as of June 2021.

Spier follows closely Warren Buffett's principles on value investing and capital allocation. However, he also admits that value investing has changed over time as the popularity of the style means that generally fewer opportunities are available to investors. Ideas that will work would still be around, but the successful value investor of today has to look further and sometimes think outside the box. More recently, Spier has eschewed all forms of activism, stating, "“My goal as an investor is to compound money for my shareholders, not to pick unnecessary fights or conduct myself like an avenging moral crusader.”

Spier has regularly advocated for probity and modesty in the management of financial firms. In 2008, Spier published a paper along with Peter Sinclair and Tom Skinner on "Bonuses, Credit Rating Agencies and the Credit Crunch" which argued that part of the cause of the 2008 crisis was short-termism leading to the miscalculation of bonuses at credit rating and other financial firms. He has also strongly advocated in favor of zero management fees when it comes to professional investment management. Spier has advocated for Switzerland to become a centre of true investing excellence, writing "while Switzerland’s biotech, health and technology clusters are extraordinarily well developed, Swiss private banking still has a long way to go".

In 2003, along with David Einhorn, Bill Ackman, and Whitney Tilson, Spier became the target of investigations by Eliot Spitzer, then the New York Attorney General, as well as by the U.S. Securities and Exchange Commission regarding short sales of Farmer Mac, MBIA, and Allied Capital. The meltdown of these companies during the late-2000s financial crisis vindicated their short thesis and became the subject of books by Ackman and Einhorn.

In 2014, Palgrave MacMillan published The Education of a Value Investor which narrates Spier's early career struggles in investment banking on Wall Street and his transformation into a value investor. The book has sold more than 175,000 copies in English and has been translated into Spanish, German, Japanese, Korean, Chinese, Polish, Hebrew, and Vietnamese.

In 2016, Spier, along with Phil Town and Matthew P. Peterson, successfully petitioned Judge Sontchi at the Delaware Court of Bankruptcy to form an official committee of equity holders of Horsehead Corporation which had filed for bankruptcy earlier that year.

In 2019, in a YouTube interview with Tilman Versch of ValueDACH, Spier likened the art of stock picking to "drunks in bars" also referencing Dan Bilzerian.

In 2020, Spier hosted a panel on "The Future of Intelligent Investing" with Niall Ferguson, Sandy Climan, and Daniel Aegerter.

Spier hosts an annual investment conference in Klosters called "VALUEx". Attendees have included Joe Chapman and Richard Reese, the former CEO of Iron Mountain.

Spier is an occasional financial commentator in the media.

In 2022, the final Glide Foundation charity lunch with Warren Buffett sold for $19,000,100 which is thirty times more than the sum that Spier and Pabrai paid.

Non-profit contributions

In 1997, Spier spoke out in The Independent against the increasing intrusion of paparazzi in British public life, writing "...if such a regime had been in place before last weekend, every tabloid which published photographs of Princess Diana and Dodi on their summer holidays would have been required to pay the resulting profits to them. I do not think that it would take too fine a legal mind to distinguish between public events, such as speeches and hospital visits, and private events, such as a ski trip with one's children or a ride in a car with a friend." In 2002, writing in the Financial Times, Spier questioned the motives of the directors of the Hershey Trust Company for selling out their stake asking, "Why would anybody in their right mind want to trade a significant share of Hershey, with its excellent characteristics, for an insignificant share of a hotchpotch of US business, probably chosen by some adviser who is better at getting selected than at delivering investment performance?". Spier regularly addresses students and other audiences including MIT, Ivey School of Business, Harvard Business School, and Google.

From 2000 to 2005, Spier served as the President of the Oxford Alumni Association of New York with the close support of Amanda Pullinger. Under his and Pullinger's leadership, the association grew to over 5,000 members and was a pioneer in bringing an American style approach on alumni relations to a British university. From 2007 to 2009, Spier served on the Advisory Board of the Dakshana Foundation. In 2011, Spier founded the VALUEx conference in Klosters. In 2017, Spier joined the newly formed board of the Swiss Friends of Oxford University. He also serves on the board of UN Watch and on the advisory boards of Horasis and World Minds He is also a member of the International Council of the Global Leadership Foundation, which was founded by Nobel Peace Prize winner F. W. de Klerk.

Personal life
Spier lives in Zurich with his wife Lory and three children – Eva, Isaac and Sarah. He is related to the Lazard, Speyer and Rothschild banking families through his great great grandmother, Johanna Lazard. He is a former resident of Tuxedo Park, New York, the village constructed by Pierre Lorillard in the late 1800s, where he lived in the Bruce Price Cottage. He is a member of Entrepreneurs' Organization and of the Young Presidents' Organization and of the Westminster Synagogue.

References

External links

personal website
Blog
Podcast with British journalist Christina Patterson
The Intelligent Investing Podcast with Eric Schleien
Authors at Google Talk

1966 births
Living people
21st-century British non-fiction writers
Alumni of Brasenose College, Oxford
German investors
Harvard Business School alumni
Israeli investors
People educated at City of London Freemen's School
People from Pietermaritzburg
English Jews
South African financiers
South African investors
Swiss investors
Swiss Jews